Second First Impression is the second studio album released by British singer-songwriter Daniel Bedingfield. Released in 8 November 2004, it peaked at number eight on the UK Albums Chart. The album title comes from the chorus of track 7 on the album, "Show Me the Real You", and also serves as a reference to this being Bedingfield's second album.

In the United Kingdom, the first single to be taken from the album was "Nothing Hurts Like Love", which peaked at number three on the UK Singles Chart in the same month as the album was released. The second single was "Wrap My Words Around You", released in February 2005, followed by "The Way". The UK release includes two bonus tracks, "Draw You" and "A Kiss Without Commitment", and a hidden track entitled "I'm Not Dead", which refers to Bedingfield's near-fatal car accident in New Zealand earlier in 2004.

Track listing
All songs written by Daniel Bedingfield, except where noted.
 "Growing Up" – 3:04
 "Complicated" – 3:31
 "Wrap My Words Around You" – 3:10
 "All Your Attention" (lyrics: Bedingfield, music: Diane Warren) – 3:46
 "The Way" – 3:17
 "Sorry" (lyrics: Bedingfield, music: Bedingfield, David Hart) – 4:59
 "Show Me the Real You" (lyrics: Bedingfield, music: Bedingfield, Hart, Eric Appapoulay) – 3:32
 "Don't Give'r It All" – 2:22
 "Nothing Hurts Like Love" (Warren) – 3:04
 "Holiness" – 3:30
 "All the Little Children" – 5:51
 The song "All the Little Children" ends at 1:51. The hidden track "I'm Not Dead" starts at 4:21.

UK bonus tracks
<li>"Draw You" (Demo) (lyrics: Bedingfield, music: Bedingfield, Hart) – 3:22
<li>"A Kiss Without Commitment" (Demo) – 2:44

Singapore bonus track
<li>"If You're Not the One" – 4:20

Charts

Weekly charts

Year-end charts

Certifications

References

2004 albums
Daniel Bedingfield albums
Polydor Records albums